Dakneshwori Temple (Nepali language: डाक्नेश्वरी मन्दिर) is a Hindu temple and Shakti Peethas in South-Eastern Nepal. The primary deity is Dakneshwori. It is situated in the Pato Bazaar , Dakneshwori Municipality, Saptari. It draws Nepali and Indian pilgrims, especially in Bada Dashain, when thousands of goats are sacrificed there.

History 
The temple was reconstructed in the 1990's.

Pilgrimage 
Every year, thousands of pilgrims from Nepal, India and other countries visit Dakneshwori Temple, especially during the festivals of Dashain.

See also 

 Saptari
 Dakneshwori Municipality

References

External links 

Hindu temples in Madhesh Province
Durga temples
Buildings and structures in Saptari District